Mouloudou is a settlement in the East Province of Cameroon. Of the tropical forest in the area, 1,082,454 km is protected for community hunting. Mouloudou was the site of a German station during the colonial period. The station was set up by Hans Dominik with the aid of Karl Atangana.

Notes

References
 Ahanda, Marie-Thérèse Assiga (2003): "Charles Atangana". Bonaberi.com. Accessed 30 October 2006.
 "Présentation des Aires Protégées". Ministère des Forêts et de la Faune du Cameroun (MINEF). Accessed 7 November 2006.

Populated places in East Region (Cameroon)